Hamburg is an unincorporated community in Silver Creek Township, Clark County, Indiana. Parts of Hamburg are within the municipal boundaries of Clarksville and Sellersburg.

History
Hamburg was laid out in 1837. It was named after Hamburg, in Germany. Hamburg contained a post office from the 1830s until the 1850s.

Geography

References

Unincorporated communities in Clark County, Indiana
Unincorporated communities in Indiana
Louisville metropolitan area
Populated places established in 1837
1837 establishments in Indiana